Gary M. Buer (born June 8, 1946) is an American educator and former football coach.  He served as the head football coach at Dakota State University in Madison, South Dakota in 1977 to 1978,  Southwest State University—now known as Southwest Minnesota State University—in Marshall, Minnesota from 1979 to 1992, and Southern Virginia University in Buena Vista, Virginia from 2003 to 2006, compiling  a career college football coaching record of 92–102–5.

Playing career and military service
A native of Atwater, Minnesota, Buer graduated from the University of Minnesota Morris, where he played college football as a defensive end.  In 1970, Buer enlisted in the United States Army serving in South Vietnam.

Coaching career

Early coaching career
After being honorably discharged from the Army, Buer worked as the defensive coordinator at St. Cloud State University in St. Cloud, Minnesota, where he earned a master's degree.  In 1973, he was an at Dakota State University in Madison, South Dakota. Buer then spent two years as an assistant his alma mater, the University of Minnesota Morris, before returning to Dakota State in March 1976 as head baseball coach and defensive coordinator for the football team.  By August 176, Buer has moved on to Brigham Young University (BYU) as a graduate assistant.  With four other graduate assistants, he coached junior varsity football team, while earning his doctorate in physical education and athletic administration.

Head coach at Dakota State
Buer's first head coaching position was at Dakota State. During his two seasons, the Trojans compiled a record of 18–2 and he was named NAIA District Coach of the Year and conference Coach of the Year in 1977 and 1978.

Minnesota
Buer coached at the University of Minnesota from 1993 to 1996 under Jim Wacker.

Marshall Senior High School
Buer served as head football coach and activities director at Marshall Senior High School in Marshall, Minnesota from 1997 to 2000.

Sabino High School
In 2001, Gary Buer was hired as head football coach at Sabino High School in Tanque Verde, Arizona. Sabino finished 5–5 in 2001 and 853 in 2002. Sabino won the league championship and made a state playoff appearance in 2002.  In 2003, Buer left the Sabercats to build a new college football program at a small, private liberal arts college in Buena Vista, VA.

Southern Virginia
In 2003, Buer was named the first head football coach at Southern Virginia University in Buena Vista, Virginia.  He helped to build the new football program and held that position for four seasons, from 2003 until 2006.  His coaching record at Southern Virginia was 4–31.

Independence High School
Gary Buer was named head football coach at Independence High School in Glendale, Arizona in 2007. In 2009 the Patriot football team won the Western Sky Region Championship and Buer was voted Region "Coach of The Year" by his coaching peers.

Head coaching record

College football

References

1946 births
Living people
American football defensive ends
Dakota State Trojans baseball coaches
Dakota State Trojans football coaches
Minnesota Golden Gophers football coaches
Minnesota Morris Cougars football coaches
Minnesota Morris Cougars football players
Southern Virginia Knights football coaches
Southwest Minnesota State Mustangs football coaches
St. Cloud State Huskies football coaches
High school football coaches in Arizona
High school football coaches in Minnesota
Brigham Young University alumni
St. Cloud State University alumni
United States Army soldiers
People from Kandiyohi County, Minnesota